Buin-e Owzin Qajaq (also Romanized as Bū'īn Owzīn Qajaq) is a village in Aqabad Rural District, in the Central District of Gonbad-e Qabus County, Golestan Province, Iran. At the 2006 census, its population was 620, in 102 families.

References 

Populated places in Gonbad-e Kavus County